Rufus K. Kegley (May 21, 1828 – March 12, 1903) was an American politician in the state of Washington. He served in the Washington House of Representatives from 1895 to 1897, alongside W. E. Runner.

References

Members of the Washington House of Representatives
1828 births
1903 deaths
Washington (state) Populists
People from Greene County, Pennsylvania
19th-century American politicians